Qeshquneh-ye Sofla (also Romanized as Qeshqūneh-ye Soflá; also known as Qeshqeneh-ye Soflá) is a village in Mangur-e Sharqi Rural District, Khalifan District, Mahabad County, West Azerbaijan Province, Iran. At the 2006 census, its population was 65, in 7 families.

References 

Populated places in Mahabad County